Magnesite Junction railway station is a non–passenger junction railway station in Salem district in Tamil Nadu.

Jurisdiction
It belongs to the Salem railway division of the Southern Railway zone of Salem district in Tamil Nadu. The station code is MGSJ.

Lines

Notable places nearby
 Steel Authority of India

References

External links
 

Salem railway division
Railway stations in Salem district
Railway junction stations in Tamil Nadu